Kumbhakarna (Sanskrit: कुम्भकर्ण, lit. pot-eared) is a powerful rakshasa and younger brother of Ravana from the Hindu epic Ramayana. Despite his gigantic size and appetite, he is described as a virtuous character and a great warrior in Hindu texts. He is said to have slaughtered 8,000 vanaras over the course of Rama's mission to rescue Sita.

Vibhishana narrated that Kumbhakarna had been born with immense strength, having subdued both Indra and Yama, striking the former in the chest with the broken tusk of Airavata. At the bequest of Indra, Brahma cursed the rakshasa to "sleep like he is dead". On Ravana's request, he commuted the curse to have the rakshasa sleep for six months at a time, and wake up for exactly one day to wreak havoc and devour to his heart's content.

In a popular retelling of this tale, Kumbhakarna, accompanied by his brothers Ravana and Vibhishana,  performed a major yajna to please Brahma. Indra was worried and jealous of his strength so he went to Brahma before Kumbhakarna's boon could come to fruition.

When Kumbhakarna asked for his boon, his tongue was tied by the goddess Saraswati, who acted on Indra's request. Instead of asking for Indraasana (the throne of Indra), he asked for Nidraasana (bed for sleeping). It is also said that he intended to ask for Nirdevatvam (annihilation of the devas) and instead asked for Nidravatvam (sleep). His request was instantly granted. However, his brother Ravana requested Brahma to undo this curse as a boon and Brahma reduced it to sleeping for six months, after which he would sleep again as soon as his appetite was satisfied.

Life

Origin 
In the Bhagavata Purana, Kumbhakarna is said to be the incarnation of the gatekeeper deity Vijaya. Vijaya, along with his brother and fellow gatekeeper Jaya, was punished by the Four Kumaras for impiety while they guarded the sacred realm of Vishnu. Vijaya was initially sentenced to mortality, but after appealing to Vishnu, their sentences were reduced to just three lifetimes, allowing them to return to Vaikuntha. While his brother Jaya became Ravana, Vijaya became Kumbhakarna during their second of three incarnations on Earth.

Personality 
Kumbhakarna is portrayed as a loyal, powerful, and fearless character who fought to defend his brother and land out of obligation and affection. He had an grand appetite and slept for months at a time.

Family 
Kumbhakarna's father is Vishrava, and his siblings are Ravana, Vibhishana, and Shurpanakha. He has two sons, Kumbha and Nikumbha, with his wife Vajrajwala, the daughter of Bali and granddaughter of Virochana, who also fought in the war against Rama and was killed.

In the war
In defense of his kingdom, Ravana charged into battle and was humiliated by Rama and his army after underestimating his enemy. He decided he needed the help of his brother Kumbhakarna, who woke up only after 1,000 elephants walked over him.

When informed of Ravana's war with Rama, Kumbhakarna tried to convince Ravana that what he is doing was wrong, that Rama is the avatar of Vishnu, and that Sita is an avatar of Lakshmi. However, Ravana was deaf to these words and Kumbhakarna chose to fight in the battle due to loyalty and affection to his brother and homeland. He joined the battle and devastated Rama's army. After a battle against Hanuman and Sugriva, he knocked the latter unconscious and took him prisoner.

Lakshmana and Kumbhakarna dueled for a long period, leaving both of them exhausted. In his battle against Rama, Kumbhakarna had one arm cut off by the Vayuastra and the other mutilated by the Indrastra. Still, he raged towards Rama, opening his mouth to swallow him whole, and was met with a volley of arrows. In the Kamba Ramayanam, Kumbhakarna acknowledges the divinity of Rama, but informs him of his dharma to fight for his brother, and only urges the prince to keep Vibhishana safe from harm. With his desire granted, he charged against Rama with his feet severed by crescent arrows. He was slain only when the Indrastra was deployed by Rama. Kumbakarna's head was decapitated, and is described to have smashed several buildings and fortifications before descending towards the sea. When Ravana heard of his brother's death, he fainted and later proclaimed that he was doomed.

See also
 Ravana
 Ramayana
 Rama
 Sita
 Rakshasa

Literature 
 "Kumbhakarna" in M.M.S. Shastri Chitrao, Bharatavarshiya Prachin Charitrakosha (Dictionary of Ancient Indian Biography, in Hindi), Pune 1964, pp. 149-151

References

External links

Sri Lanka, Virtual Library. KUMBHAKARNA
Pot-Ear's Awakening. From the Ramayana, as translated by Arthur W. Ryder

 Rakshasa in the Ramayana
 Asura
 Characters_in_the_Ramayana